The 1971 Commonwealth Heads of Government Meeting, officially known as the I Commonwealth Heads Meeting, and commonly known as Singapore 1971, was the first Meeting of the Heads of Government of the Commonwealth of Nations (formerly named the British Commonwealth). It was held from 14 to 22 January 1971 in Singapore, and was hosted by that country's Prime Minister, Lee Kuan Yew.

British prime minister Edward Heath advised Queen Elizabeth II not to attend the conference due to a row within the Commonwealth over Britain selling arms to South Africa. It would be the only CHOGM the Queen would miss until 2013.

Ugandan president Milton Obote was overthrown by Idi Amin in a military coup, whilst he was attending the meeting.

At the meeting the Singapore Declaration of Commonwealth Principles was agreed setting out the core political values that would form the main part of the Commonwealth's membership criteria. The final document was not ratified by Pakistan. Topics discussed at the meeting included Chinese representation at the United Nations, East-West relations, conflict in the Southeast Asia, Portuguese violations of Guinean sovereignty and situation in Portuguese colonies, and South African situation. Members also discussed the repercussions of future Accession of the United Kingdom to the European Communities.

References

1971
Diplomatic conferences in Singapore
20th-century diplomatic conferences
1971 in international relations
1971 in Singapore
1971 conferences
January 1971 events in Asia
Singapore and the Commonwealth of Nations